Crank: High Voltage is the soundtrack for the 2009 film of the same name, composed and mostly performed by Mike Patton. It is similar to his work with Fantômas, as both this soundtrack and the band's studio album Suspended Animation feature the same mix of intense noise with silence and other, pseudo-random sound sources, with song lengths being similar too (most being less than 2 minutes).

Track listing 
 "Kickin’"
 "Chelios"
 "Sweet Cream (Redux)"
 "Organ Donor"
 "Chickenscratch"
 "Tourettes Romance"
 "Doc Miles"
 "El Huron"
 "Tourettes Breakdance"
 "Juice Me"
 "Hallucination"
 "Porn Strike"
 "Surgery"
 "Social Club"
 "Chocolate Theme"
 "Ball Torture"
 "Chevzilla"
 "The Hammer Drops"
 "Triad Limo"
 "Shock & Shootout"
 "Pixelvision"
 "Spring Loaded"
 "Verona"
 "Car Park Throwdown"
 "Noticias"
 "Catalina Island"
 "Supercharged"
 "Massage Parlor"
 "Full Body Tourettes"
 "Epilogue – In My Dreams"
 "Friction"
 "Epiphany"

References

External links 
 IGN's review.

Mike Patton albums
2009 soundtrack albums
Action film soundtracks